The Music Circle is situated in Rourkela's Chhend Colony, in Odisha, India.

This organization runs the Academy Of Dance & Music.

Education in Rourkela
Music schools in India
2007 establishments in Orissa